Tregaron Turfs Football Club is a Welsh football team based in Tregaron, Ceredigion, Wales.  The team currently play in the Central Wales League Southern Division, which is at the fourth tier of the Welsh football league system.

History
The club played in the Aberystwyth League before in 2010–11 they joined the newly created Mid Wales Football League Division Two. They only stayed in the league for two seasons.

The club then returned to the Aberystwyth League, where they were Division On champions again in 2012–13 and at the end of the 2019–20 season.

In July 2020 the club was announced as one of the tier 4 clubs in the restructured West Division of the Mid Wales Football League.

Honours

Aberystwyth League Division One – Champions (3): 1955–56; 2012–13; 2019–20

External links
Club official Twitter
Club official Facebook

References

Sport in Ceredigion
Mid Wales Football League clubs
Football clubs in Wales